Mind Games was a one-off British crime drama broadcast on ITV1 on 6 January 2001, starring Fiona Shaw as the protagonist, Frances O'Neill, a former nun turned criminal profiler who is called in to investigate the horrific ritualistic murders of two middle-aged women. Written by Lynda La Plante and directed by Richard Standeven, the film gathered 6.91m viewers.

The DVD of the film was released on 23 July 2007. In the United States, the film aired on PBS during the Lynda La Plante season, which also included broadcasts of Prime Suspect, Trial & Retribution and Supply & Demand.

Plot
A serial killer is at large, committing a series of horrific murders. Frances O'Neill (Fiona Shaw) draws on her training as a profiler and her strong religious background to try to get inside the killer's mind and track him down before he is able to strike again.

Cast
 Fiona Shaw as DI Frances O'Neill
 Finbar Lynch as DCI Chris Medwynter
 Colin Salmon as DC Ricky Grover
 Chiwetel Ejiofor as Tyler Arnold
 Crispin Bonham-Carter as DC Terry Beale
 Ian Targett as DC Roger Ball
 Geoffrey Church as DC Matt Begg
 Tanya Ronder as DC Samantha Western
 Lisa Palfrey as DC Rebecca Longton

Critical reception

References

External links 
 

2001 television films
2001 films
British thriller television films
ITV television dramas
British crime films
2000s English-language films
British detective films
Television series produced at Pinewood Studios
2000s British films